Jerry Ito (July 12, 1927 in New York City, New York – July 8, 2007 in Los Angeles, California) was a Japanese-American film and television actor, born as Gerald Tamekichi Itō, specializing in Japanese films throughout the 1950s, 1960s and 1970s. He was a cousin of Japanese-American composer Teiji Itō.

Filmography

Death
He died four days before his 80th birthday of pneumonia while battling stomach cancer.

External links 

1927 births
2007 deaths
Male actors from New York City
American military personnel of Japanese descent
American male film actors
American male television actors
American film actors of Asian descent
Deaths from pneumonia in California
Deaths from stomach cancer
Deaths from cancer in California
American male actors of Japanese descent
20th-century American male actors